Ukrainian Physicists' Tournament for University Students (commonly abbreviated as СТФ) is a creative team competition of university students targeted to realize their potential through solving complicated scientific problems and defending their research projects in a scientific discussion, called Physics Fight. Is a part of International Physicists' Tournament.

The look-and-feel of the competition has a lot of common with the IYPT. The problems are known in a long time before the competition, are fully original and are proposed by the Organizing Committee after open selection and discussion.

However, the teams are expected to provide researches at a significantly higher level than secondary school students do, and the jurors are expected to be much more critical about the consistence of methods, approaches and results.

History
Physicists' Tournaments for University Students were created as a continuation of school Tournaments of Young Physicists for more experienced participants. The first Open Physicists' Tournament for University Students was held in Odessa in October 2001. The following tournament received the status of All-Ukrainian, and since then the tournaments are held every academic year. Sometimes tournaments take place in fall, sometimes in spring, so each calendar year there are 0 to 2 tournaments.

Since 2005, foreign teams started participating in the tournament: first from Russia, then from the Netherlands. It was therefore decided to organize the International Physicists' Tournament. The first International Physicists' Tournament was held in Kyiv in 2009. Since then, Ukrainian Physicists' Tournament for University Students became a step in the selection for the International Physicists' Tournament.

Organization

Teams receive a list of 17 research problems and have a few months to solve them. Generally, solving these problems includes conducting experiments, constructing theoretical models, literature analysis. Each team consists of 4-6 students.

Then the teams come together for the final stage of the tournament, and present their solutions in the format of Physics Fights. During a Physics Fight each team consequently acts as a reporter, an opponent and a reviewer. The opponent challenges the reporter for one of the problems. The reporter has the right to reject some problems, but then accepts the challenge. One or two representatives of the reporter team make a 9-minute report on the solution of the accepted problem. Then a representative of the opponent team opposes the solution (analyses its advantages and disadvantages), and a representative of the reviewer team does a review (analyses the form of the report and the review, and the discussion between the reporter and the opponent). The reporter, the opponent and the reviewer conduct polemics on the proposed report. Jurors ask clarifying questions to the reporter, the opponent and the reviewer, and put marks for their work. The jury usually consists of the university faculties and scientists. Watching the timetable and moderating the discussion is entrusted to the chairperson.

The first few Physics Fights of the tournament are selective fights. Each team meets different competitors at random. Depending on the number of battles won and the number of points obtained, each team gets its rating, and the nine top-rated teams pass to the semifinals. Three semi-final battles are conducted, three teams in each, and the three winners pass to the final, while the three teams ranked second in their semi-final groups receive 3rd prizes. (For a small number of participants a different scheme of the tournament is possible, without semi-final, with tree top-rated teams after selective fights passing directly to the final.) In the final, each team chooses the problem it wants to report. The winner of the final receives the 1st prize and the right to participate in the International Physicists' Tournament, while two other finalists receive 2nd prizes. A bigger number of winners is possible if teams gain indistinguishably similar number of points.

Winners of the tournament

Notes

Further reading
 Голубов О., Ліпатова В. Всеукраїнський студентський турнір фізиків // Фізика в школах України. Позакласна робота. — Харків: «Основа», 2016. — Серпень (No. 8 (32)). — С. 33–34. 
 Колебошин В., Анісімов І. Гра для інтелектуалів. Перший Всеукраїнський студентський турнір фізиків. Освіта. — 2003. — 7-14 травня (No. 20). — С. 1. 
 Анісімов І. Другий Всеукраїнський студентський турнір фізиків. — Освіта України. — 2004. — 14 травня (No. 37). — С. 3

External links
Official site of Ukrainian Physicists' Tournament for University Students 

Student quiz competitions
Physics competitions
Youth in Ukraine
Youth science
Education competitions in Ukraine
Science events in Ukraine
Physics education in Ukraine